CIE Automotive is an industrial group specialised in supplying components and subassemblies for the automotive market. It is listed on the Madrid and Bilbao stock markets, and it has presence in 4 continents and 15 countries.

CIE Automotive focuses its activity on seven technologies — Aluminium, Forging, Stamping and Tube Welding, Machining, Plastic, Casting and Roof Systems.

In 2018, Nugar Puebla (Mexico) was founded, a company that has automatic welding and assembly lines with robots. That same year Autometal Minas (Brazil) was acquired, which was founded as Zanini Industria de Autopeças, Ltda. Іn 1997 and is dedicated to the injection, chrome plating and painting of plastic parts for the automotive sector. Its products include emblems, wheel covers, front grilles, access systems for the fuel tank, spoilers and body moldings.

Shareholders 
As of June 2020:

References

External links 
 

Auto parts suppliers of Spain